Robert G. Dela Hunt (March 20, 1912 – December 13, 1970) was an American lawyer and politician.

Born in Milwaukee, Wisconsin, Dela Hunt graduated from Marquette University High School. He then received his bachelor's degree from Marquette University and his law degree from Marquette University Law School. He practiced law in Milwaukee. Dela Hunt served in the Wisconsin State Assembly and was a Republican. Dela Hunt died of a heart attack at his home in Shorewood, Wisconsin.

Notes

1912 births
1970 deaths
Politicians from Milwaukee
Marquette University alumni
Marquette University Law School alumni
Wisconsin lawyers
Republican Party members of the Wisconsin State Assembly
20th-century American politicians
Lawyers from Milwaukee
20th-century American lawyers
Marquette University High School alumni